A hellscape is a harsh environment, an unpleasant place, or a scene thought to resemble hell. A depiction of hell in a work of art is called a hellscape.

The earliest known use of the term in print was in 1894.

In real life
Writers have sometimes described wartime environments as hellscapes, and after the atomic bombings of Hiroshima and Nagasaki, the cities were defined as such by its survivors. Writers have also used hellscape to describe the scene of a natural disaster such as a drought, plague, flood, or wildfire. Projections of the consequences of global warming have been described by journalists as hellscapes.

The usage of recreational drugs such as heroin has been described by its users as creating hellscapes.

In the tech press, journalists have defined Internet disinformation as a hellscape. Some have specluated the replacing of human labor with intelligent robots could lead to a future hellscape, as well as child sex dolls.

Vox wrote that postmodern philosophers have predicted a post-truth hellscape.

In October 2022, after purchasing Twitter, Elon Musk stated that it couldn't become "a free-for-all hellscape".

In movies

In movies, depictions of hellscapes are common.

Apocalypse Now depicts earthly hellscapes, during war. Other notable examples in cinema include Blade Runner 2049, Alien, Mad Max: Fury Road, as well as all of the Mad Max series.

In art
Hieronymus Bosch's The Last Judgement depicts a religious hellscape. Other examples are Jan van Eyck's Crucifixion and Last Judgement diptych, and Pieter Bruegel the Elder's Dull Gret.

In literature

Dante Alighieri's Inferno is one of the best-known examples of a hellscape. The Great Gatsby depicts the "Valley of the Ashes" as a hellscape.

In video games

A number of video games depict hellscapes, including Hellblade: Senua's Sacrifice.

References

External links

 Security robots break up homeless camps
 Japan Sends Robot Into the Nuclear Hell of the Fukushima Reactor
 Nuclear war would be a hellscape
 Westerners are so convinced China is a dystopian hellscape they’ll share anything that confirms it
 Nuclear winter in Beijing
 If America becomes a dystopian hellscape, it might look like this
 The Architects of Our Digital Hellscape Are Very Sorry
 Astronomers discover hellscape planet that rains rocks, has lava seas
 A Youtube video, Heroin Hellscape in Kensington, Philadelphia
 Opinion: On the ground in Philly’s heroin scene

Hell